Maximilian Brückner (born 10 January 1979) is a German actor. He has won numerous awards including the Deutscher Kritikerpreis in 2006 and received a European Shooting Stars Award in 2007.

Career
Maximilian Brückner graduated from the Otto Falckenberg School in Munich, and received his first engagement at the Munich Volkstheater. He was one of the students selected in 2001 by theater director Christian Stückl for the summer academy for Baierisches Volksschauspiel.

In a new production Brückner took over the role of Boanlkramer in Kurt Wilhelm's play The Brandner Kaspar and eternal life. Aged 23, he took over the leading role from veteran actor Toni Berger, (1921–2005) who had embodied this in the original staging more than 1000 times. He describes his role as a "blend of Pumuckl, Marilyn Manson and Gollum of The Lord of the Rings. The Boanlkramer is not stupid. He's like a little kid given power over an army".

Since 2003, Brückner has also appeared in numerous film and television productions. In 2004, he played 'the Mammon' in Everyman at the Salzburg Festival. Then in October 2006, he worked together with Gregor Weber (as Stephan Deininger) on Tatort as crime scene investigator Franz Kappl, broadcast on Saarland Radio. After the filming of the seventh episode (broadcast in January 2012), the contracts with the actor was not renewed. He did not like his overambitious character. In 2012, Brückner had a small role as a German officer in Steven Spielberg's war epic War Horse.

He has made numerous stage appearances in the theatre including at Münchner Volkstheater since 2002, with Die Räuber (Karl Moor), Der Räuber Kneißl (as Mathias Kneißl, based on Mathias Kneißl's life), Der Brandner Kaspar und das ewig' Leben (Boandlkramer),  Baumeister Solness (by Ibsen) in 2017, and Peer Gynt (as Peer), all directed by Christian Stückl. He made his directorial debut, also at the Münchner Volkstheater, in 2012 with Ludwig Thoma's play Magdalena, with his brother Florian Brückner in the lead.

Personal life

Maximilian Brückner lives with two brothers (he has seven younger siblings) and parents on a farm in Chiemgau in Upper Bavaria. The family renovated the farmhouse in 2011, with Maximilian doing a lot of plastering. He has been married to Magdalena Staudacher since 2013, they have one child. He dances Schuhplattler and plays the tuba in a local brass band with his brothers. His brothers are Florian Brückner, Dominic Brückner and Franz Xaver Brückner and his sisters are Susanne Brückner and Isabella Brückner are all actors. As three brothers Paul, Lukas and Hansi.

Politically, he is a supporter of the Christian Social Union of Bavaria. In March 2008, Maximilian Brückner was elected at the local elections in Bavaria for the CSU municipal council in his hometown of Riedering, in the district of Rosenheim. However, due to his change of residence, he has returned this mandate.

Filmography

Film

Television

Awards
 2005 – Merkur-Theaterpreis (Merkur-theatre-prize, voted by readers of Münchner Merkur) for his portrayal of Boandl Kramer in The Brandner Kaspar and eternal life 
 2005 – Star of the Year of the Munich Abendzeitung for his portrayal of the Boandl Kramer in The Brandner Kaspar and eternal life
 2005 – (Austrian) Undine Award – nomination best film debutant 
 2006 – German Critics Award
 2006 – Romy (TV award) – nomination for Best Male Shooting Star
 2006 – Nomination for the Adolf Grimme Award for his performance in the films Papa und Mama and Tatort: Tod auf der Walz
 2006 – Bavarian Art Prize – Department of Performing Arts
 2007 – European Shooting Star 2007 from Germany of the European Film Promotion (EFP) as part of the Berlinale 
 2007 – Cultural Award of the district of Rosenheim
 2018 – Bavarian Television Award – Best Actor in the category TV Movie / Series and Series for his role in Hindafing (BR)

References

External links

 
 Maximilian Brückner's page at his agency 'die agenten' website
 Fansite gesucht wird: Maximilian Brückner / in search of : Maximilian Brückner

1979 births
Living people
German male film actors
German male television actors
German male stage actors
Male actors from Munich
21st-century German male actors